Van der Hoorn is a Dutch surname. Notable people with the surname include:

Fred van der Hoorn (born 1963), Dutch football defender and manager
Mike van der Hoorn (born 1992), Dutch football defender
Taco van der Hoorn (born 1993), Dutch racing cyclist

See also
Van Hoorn (surname)
Van Horne (disambiguation)
Van Horn (disambiguation)
Den Hoorn (disambiguation)

Dutch-language surnames
Surnames of Dutch origin